The Taranaki rugby league team (also known as the Taranaki Wildcats, formerly the Taranaki Sharks and the Taranaki Rockets) are New Zealand rugby league team that represents the Taranaki Rugby League. They currently compete in the NZRL National Competition (Zonal team) and the Rugby League Cup (District team).

History

1908–1993 

Taranaki competed in the very first season of provincial rugby league in New Zealand. They shared a two match series with Auckland 1-all. Taranaki was led by New Zealand international Adam Lile.

In 2008 the Taranaki Rugby League named its Team of the Century: Dave Watson; Babe Hooker; Ron McKay; Willie Talau; Ernest Buckland; Tony Kemp; Issac Luke; Bruce Gall; Howie Tamati; Wille Southorn; Graeme West; Adam Lile; Barry Harvey. Bench: Jack McLeod; Fred White; Lance Moir; Jim Parker; Charles Hunt.

1994–1996: Lion Red Cup
As the Taranaki Rockets, Taranaki competed in the Lion Red Cup between 1994 and 1996. They were coached by Teri Tamati, Allan Marshall and Howard Tamati over the three years of the competition.

The team was originally going to be called the Taranaki Energisers but this name was vetoed by Eveready Batteries who owned the name in New Zealand.

Season results

1997–2002 
In 1997 the Taranaki Rugby League side that competed in the Super League Challenge Cup was also called the Rockets.

They adopted the Sharks nickname in 1998 after a public competition. Notable players included Paul Rauhihi, Iva Ropati and Artie Shead.

2002–2003: Bartercard Cup 
In 2002 and 2003 the Taranaki Wildcats competed in the Bartercard Cup. They were coached by Alan Jackson.

Season results 

The Wildcats entered the competition in 2002 alongside the Central Falcons. They managed to compete in most games, winning two and with two draws. This was not enough to avoid the wooden spoon but most pundits predicted they would be better for the experience in 2003.

In 2003 they again collected the wooden spoon, only managing to win one game all season.

2008–2009: Bartercard Premiership 
Taranaki were part of the Bartercard Premiership in 2008 and 2009, however they were not competitive and finished last and second to last in each year.

2010–present: National Competition 
In 2010, they joined the NZRL National Competition from the defunct Bartercard Premiership.

Notable players 

The Taranaki team of the century was named in 2008 and included: 1. Dave Watson, 2. Babe Hooker, 3. Ron McKay, 4. Willie Talau, 5. Ernest Buckland, 6. Tony Kemp, 7. Issac Luke, 8. Bruce Gall, 9. Howie Tamati, 10. Willie Southorn, 11. Graeme West, 12. Adam Lile and 13. Barry Harvey. Bench: Jack McLeod, Fred White, Lance Moir, Jim Parker and 18. Charles Hunt. The coach was Alan Marshall and Graham Church was named as the referee of the century.

References 

New Zealand rugby league teams
Rugby league in Taranaki
1908 establishments in New Zealand